Morpheus is a 1987 shoot 'em up developed by Graftgold for the Commodore 64 and published by Rainbird. The game's designer, Andrew Braybrook, wrote a series of articles on the game's creation for the magazine Zzap!64 over eight months.

Gameplay 
Morpheus features 50 subuniverses called Aithers, each of which consists of a central Nucleus surrounded by obstacles called Orbitals. The aim of the game is for players to break through the obstacles to destroy the Nucleus, and by the end of level 50, Morpheus as a whole. Players will also encounter enemies such as Morphii and aliens which can be killed for points. Morpheus allows players to use points earned to purchase weapons, and customize various features of their ships, such as auxiliary weapons and expansion ports to allow various gameplay possibilities.

Reception
Zzap!64 magazines positively reviewed the game and awarded it a Sizzler rating with an overall score of 90%. They described it as "without a doubt one of the most finely constructed games ever written for the 64". The graphics were praised, but reviewers noted that the gameplay style significantly departed from Braybrook's previous games. Reviewers recommended that readers try the game before purchasing. Although technically accomplished, it might not appeal to everyone. Many Commodore Users were also enthusiastic about the game, saying it "reeks of quality". Their only criticism was the lack of a game save and load facility. Zzap!64 gave it a 9 out of 10 rating.

Computer and Video Games' reviews were less enthusiastic about the game, which they considered a disappointment, noting "the originality of the game is great, but the gameplay is extremely laborious." The reviewer believed the music and sound effects were the best thing about the game, saying it was "visually very good." They advised potential purchasers to try the game first. It was rated 7/10.

References

External links

Morpheus box and manual at C64Sets.com

1987 video games
Commodore 64 games
Commodore 64-only games
Graftgold games
Multiplayer and single-player video games
Shoot 'em ups
Telecomsoft games
Video games developed in the United Kingdom
sv:Morpheus (datorspel)